Camirus is a genus of shield-backed bugs in the family Scutelleridae. There are at least four described species in Camirus.

Species
These four species belong to the genus Camirus:
 Camirus conicus (Germar, 1839) g
 Camirus consocius (Uhler, 1876) i c g b
 Camirus moestus (Stål, 1862) i c g
 Camirus porosus (Germar, 1839) i c g
Data sources: i = ITIS, c = Catalogue of Life, g = GBIF, b = Bugguide.net

References

Further reading

External links

 

Scutelleridae